Irvin David Yalom (born June 13, 1931) is an American existential psychiatrist who is emeritus professor of psychiatry at Stanford University, as well as author of both fiction and nonfiction.

Early life 
Yalom was born in Washington, D.C. About fifteen years prior to his birth in the United States, Yalom's Jewish parents emigrated from Russia (though their country of origin was Poland or Belarus) and eventually opened a grocery store in Washington DC. Yalom spent much of his childhood reading books in the family home above the grocery store and in a local library. After graduating from high school, he attended George Washington University and then Boston University School of Medicine.

Career
After graduating with a BA from George Washington University in 1952 and a Doctor of Medicine from Boston University School of Medicine in 1956 he went on to complete his internship at Mount Sinai Hospital in New York and his residency at the Phipps Clinic of Johns Hopkins Hospital in Baltimore and completed his training in 1960. After two years of Army service at Tripler General Hospital in Honolulu, Yalom began his academic career at Stanford University. He was appointed to the faculty in 1963 and promoted over the following years, being granted tenure in 1968. Soon after this period he made some of his most lasting contributions by teaching about group psychotherapy and developing his model of existential psychotherapy.

His writing on existential psychology centers on what he refers to as the four "givens" of the human condition: isolation, meaninglessness, mortality and freedom, and discusses ways in which the human person can respond to these concerns either in a functional or dysfunctional fashion.

In 1970, Yalom published The Theory and Practice of Group Psychotherapy, speaking about the research literature around group psychotherapy and the social psychology of small group behavior. This work explores how individuals function in a group context, and how members of group therapy gain from his participation group.

In addition to his scholarly, non-fiction writing, Yalom has produced a number of novels and also experimented with writing techniques. In Every Day Gets a Little Closer Yalom invited a patient to co-write about the experience of therapy. The book has two distinct voices which are looking at the same experience in alternating sections. Yalom's works have been used as collegiate textbooks and standard reading for psychology students. His new and unique view of the patient/client relationship has been added to curriculum in psychology programs at such schools as John Jay College of Criminal Justice in New York City.

Yalom has continued to maintain a part-time private practice and has authored a number of video documentaries on therapeutic techniques. Yalom is also featured in the 2003 documentary Flight from Death, a film that investigates the relationship of human violence to fear of death, as related to subconscious influences.  The Irvin D. Yalom Institute of Psychotherapy, which he co-directs with Professor Ruthellen Josselson, works to advance Yalom's approach to psychotherapy. This unique combination of integrating more philosophy into the psychotherapy can be considered as psychosophy.

He was married to author and historian Marilyn Yalom, who died in November, 2019. Their four children are: Eve, a gynecologist, Reid, a photographer, Victor, a psychologist and entrepreneur and Ben, a theater director.

Awards 
 1974:  Edward Strecker Award for significant contribution to the field of psychiatry patient by The University Pennsylvania, School of Medicine, Department of Psychiatry
 1976:  Foundation's Fund Award for research in psychiatry by The American Psychiatric Association
 1977:  Fellowship Award by The Center for Advanced Study in the Behavioral Sciences
 1987:  Fellowship Award by The Rockefeller Foundation (Bellagio, Italy)
 1992:  Commonwealth Club Gold Award for fiction best novel (When Nietzsche Wept) by The Commonwealth Club of California
2001:  Oskar Pfister Award for important contributions to religion and psychiatry by the American Psychiatric Foundation/American Psychiatric Association
 2009:  International Sigmund Freud Award for Psychotherapy of the city of Vienna, Austria by The World Council for Psychotherapy

Publications

Fiction and Memoir
1974 Every Day Gets a Little Closer 
1989 Love's Executioner and Other Tales of Psychotherapy 
1992 When Nietzsche Wept  (Kindle edition 2019)
1996 Lying on the Couch 
1999 Momma and the Meaning of Life 
2005 The Schopenhauer Cure 
2005 I'm Calling the Police! A Tale of Regression and Recovery
2012 The Spinoza Problem 
2015  Creatures of a Day - And Other Tales of Psychotherapy,

Nonfiction
1970 The Theory and Practice of Group Psychotherapy  (6th edition 2020)
1980 Existential Psychotherapy   (Kindle edition 2020)
1983 Inpatient Group Psychotherapy 
1996 The Yalom Reader 
2001 The Gift of Therapy: An Open Letter to a New Generation of Therapists and Their Patients 
2008 Staring at the Sun: Overcoming the Terror of Death  
2017 Becoming Myself: A Psychiatrist's Memoir 
2021 A Matter of Death and Life, co-written with Marilyn Yalom

Filmography
2003 Flight from Death (directed by Patrick Shen, featuring Ron Leifer, Robert Jay Lifton, Merlyn Mowrey and Sheldon Solomon and Irvin D. Yalom)
2007 When Nietzsche Wept (directed by Pinchas Perry, featuring Ben Cross, Armand Assante, Katheryn Winnick)
2014 Yalom's Cure (directed by Sabine Gisiger)

See also 
 responsibility assumption

References

External links

The musical composition of On the Threshold, dedicated to Dr. Yalom by International Iranian philosophical composition, Pezhman Mosleh:
You can find following text in Dr. Yalom’s Facebook about the music:
An eminent Iranian composer, Pezhman Mosleh, has honored me with this gift: a musical composition and video arrangement.

 Hans Steiner, MD, Stanford University, School of Medicine: Laudatio for Irvin David Yalom, MD, Zeitschrift für Individualpsychologie

1931 births
American psychiatrists
Boston University School of Medicine alumni
Group psychotherapists
Jewish American scientists
Jewish psychiatrists
Jewish scientists
Jewish philosophers
Living people
Stanford University School of Medicine faculty
Existential therapists
American male writers
Center for Advanced Study in the Behavioral Sciences fellows
George Washington University alumni